Expanding Anyway is the debut full-length album by psychedelic rock band Morning Teleportation. The album was released on Glacial Pace Recordings on March 8, 2011.

Critical reception
Spin wrote that the band's "energy can be so overpowering that it takes a minute to notice the adeptness of the musicianship — [frontman Tiger] Merritt’s exciting prog guitar riffs make the nine-minute 'Wholehearted Drifting Sense of Inertia' feel too short." NPR called the album "a raw and tantalizing piece of work." PopMatters wrote that Morning Teleportation's "sloppy, anything-goes aesthetic makes their debut album an unhinged ball of fun."

Track listing

References

2011 albums
Morning Teleportation albums